The Ghost List is an EP by American post-hardcore band Girls Against Boys which was released independently on September 24, 2013. The EP was recorded in New York and was released eleven years after their previous album from 2002.

The inspiration for the EP was some song ideas from 2003, from just after the group's final album, You Can't Fight What You Can't See, that Eli Janney rediscovered.

Stuart Berman of Pitchfork describes The Ghost List as "a successful reboot for a mothballed machine whose core components-- brawn, dissonance, and groove-- are shown to be still in fine working order. Sure, we’ve seen this movie before, but Girls Against Boys haven't forgotten the good parts."

Track listing

Personnel 
Adapted from The Ghost List liner notes.
 Girls Against Boys
 Alexis Fleisig – drums
 Eli Janney – keyboards, bass guitar, backing vocals
 Scott McCloud – lead vocals, guitar
 Johnny Temple – bass guitar

Release history

References

External links 
 

2013 EPs
Girls Against Boys albums